George Adolphus Hutchings (1843 – December 28, 1920) was a merchant and politician in Newfoundland. He represented Port de Grave in the Newfoundland House of Assembly from 1885 to 1889 as a member of the Reform Party.

Hutchings was born in St. John's and was educated there. Around 1859, he began work with C.F. Bennett and Company as a junior clerk. In 1879, Hutchings became manager at Job Brothers and Company. By 1894, he had become president of the St. John's Floating Dry Dock Company. He also served as a director for several companies.

Hutchings did not run for reelection to the Newfoundland assembly in 1889.

References 

Members of the Newfoundland and Labrador House of Assembly
1843 births
1920 deaths
Newfoundland Colony people